Fresneda de Altarejos is a municipality in Cuenca, Castile-La Mancha, Spain. It has a population of 85.

Municipalities in the Province of Cuenca